National Highway 965D, commonly referred to as NH 965D is a national highway in India. It is a secondary route of National Highway 65.  NH-965D runs in the state of Maharashtra in India.

Route 
NH965D connects Kedgaon, Supe, Morgaon, Nira, Lonand, Wathar and Satara in the state of Maharashtra.

Junctions  
 
  Terminal near Kedagaon.
  near Lonand
  Terminal near Satara.

See also 
 List of National Highways in India
 List of National Highways in India by state

References

External links 

 NH 965D on OpenStreetMap

National highways in India
National Highways in Maharashtra